Andritsaina–Krestena is a municipality in the Elis regional unit, West Greece region, Greece. The seat of the municipality is the town Krestena. The municipality has an area of 422.334 km2.

Municipality
The municipality Andritsaina–Krestena was formed at the 2011 local government reform by the merger of the following 3 former municipalities, that became municipal units:
Alifeira
Andritsaina
Skillounta

References

External link

Municipalities of Western Greece
Populated places in Elis